Eyes of a Child may refer to:

"Eyes of a Child" (The Moody Blues song), a song in two parts by The Moody Blues from the 1969 album To Our Children's Children's Children
"Eyes of a Child", a song by En Vogue from the 1997 album EV3
"Eyes of a Child", a song by Soul Asylum from the 1995 album Let Your Dim Light Shine
"Eyes of a Child", a song by Michael McDonald from the film South Park: Bigger, Longer & Uncut
"Eyes of a Child", a song by Steve Morse from the 1996 album StressFest
Eyes of a Child (novel), a novel by Richard North Patterson

See also
 "Eyes of the Child", a 1993 song by Debbie Gibson
 "Through the Eyes of a Child", a 2008 song by Reamonn